Grebnice is a village in Šamac, Republika Srpska, Bosnia and Herzegovina.

Demographics 
According to the 2013 census, its population was 1,358, with 455 living in the Šamac part and 903 in the Domaljevac-Šamac part.

References

Populated places in Domaljevac
Populated places in Šamac, Bosnia and Herzegovina
Villages in Republika Srpska